Baptisia sphaerocarpa (common names include yellow wild indigo) is a herbaceous perennial plant in the family Fabaceae.  It is native to southern North America.

References

Sophoreae
Flora of the Southeastern United States
Flora of the South-Central United States
Flora without expected TNC conservation status